Steve Guy (born 15 March 1959) is a former professional tennis player from New Zealand.

Career
Guy appeared in the singles draw of three Australian Opens and never progressed past the second round. He did however, in the 1989 Australian Open, win the second set against third seed Boris Becker. In doubles he competed in five Grand Slams but registered just one win, in the 1988 Australian Open, with countryman Bruce Derlin. At the 1991 Australian Open, Guy partnered Swedish great Stefan Edberg.

His only ATP Tour title came in the doubles at the 1989 Heineken Open in Auckland. As a singles player he made quarter-finals at the 1988 Frankfurt Open, 1990 OTB International Open and the 1990 Benson & Hedges Open. At the Benson & Hedges Open, which he entered as a wildcard, he upset second seed and world number 25 Miloslav Mečíř.

He also played tennis for the New Zealand Davis Cup team, taking part in seven ties. He had a 3/4 record in singles and 2/1 record in doubles.

ATP career finals

Doubles: 1 (1 title)

ATP Challenger and ITF Futures finals

Singles: 2 (1–1)

Doubles: 6 (5–1)

Performance timelines

Singles

Doubles

External links

References

1959 births
Living people
New Zealand male tennis players